Mind reading may refer to:

Discernment of Spirits
 Telepathy, the transfer of information between individuals by means other than the five senses
 The illusion of telepathy in the performing art of mentalism
 Cold reading, a set of techniques used by mentalists to imply that the reader knows much more about the person than the reader actually does
 Hot reading, a technique used when giving a psychic reading in stage magic performances
 Brain-reading, the use of neuroimaging techniques to read human minds
 A cognitive distortion of the jumping to conclusions type
 "Mind Reading" (short story), a story by Kwak Jaesik

See also
 Mindreader (disambiguation)